Aida İsayeva (born 12 September 1973) is an Azerbaijani racewalker. She competed in the women's 20 kilometres walk at the 2000 Summer Olympics.

References

1973 births
Living people
Athletes (track and field) at the 2000 Summer Olympics
Azerbaijani female racewalkers
Olympic athletes of Azerbaijan
Place of birth missing (living people)